Nicolas Wähling (born 24 August 1997) is a German professional footballer who plays as a midfielder for Regionalliga Nordost club Energie Cottbus.

After two years playing for SSV Jahn Regensburg, he joined SSV Ulm 1846 in summer 2021.

His elder brother Alexander is also a footballer; their father is German and their mother is English.

References

External links
 
 

1997 births
Living people
Association football midfielders
German footballers
2. Bundesliga players
Regionalliga players
Karlsruher SC players
TSG 1899 Hoffenheim II players
SSV Jahn Regensburg players
SSV Ulm 1846 players
FC Energie Cottbus players
People from Ludwigsburg
Sportspeople from Stuttgart (region)
Footballers from Baden-Württemberg
German people of English descent